Cercanías Málaga is a commuter rail service between central Málaga, Spain, and towns in the province. The trains are powered by overhead lines and run on broad Iberian gauge track.

History

In 1908 the first line of the Ferrocarriles Suburbanos de Málaga opened; a metre-gauge rail network connecting Málaga to Vélez-Málaga. This line was later extended to Ventas de Zafarraya, along with lines to Coín and Fuengirola. The lines closed in stages between 1960 and 1968. Part of the corridor to Fuengirola was rebuilt to 1668 mm Iberian gauge, with some sections placed underground including a re-routing of the line through Málaga Airport, branded as Cercanías Málaga, and opened in 1975.

Lines and stations
The busiest stations on the network in 2018 were Málaga-Centro Alameda with 1,525,000 passengers, Fuengirola (1,408,000), Málaga María  Zambrano (1,375,000), Arroyo de la Miel (1,293,000) and Torremolinos (1,109,000).

Line C-1 Malaga - Airport - Fuengirola 

Line C-1 runs along the Costa del Sol. Services were half-hourly, but since 22 September 2011 the frequency has been increased to every 20 minutes.

There are long-standing plans to extend this line to Estepona to the west, and to Nerja in the east, but current stations are:
 Centro-Alameda connecting to Metro de Málaga
 María Zambrano connecting to Madrid–Málaga high-speed rail line/Metro de Málaga
 Victoria Kent (see Victoria Kent)
 Guadalhorce
 Aeropuerto with eventual connection to Metro de Málaga
 San Julián (canceled)
 Plaza Mayor 	
 Los Álamos 	
 La Colina 	
 Torremolinos 	
 Montemar-Alto 	
 El Pinillo
 Benalmádena-Arroyo de la Miel
 Torremuelle
 Carvajal
 Torreblanca
 Los Boliches
 Fuengirola

Line C-2 Málaga - Álora 
Line C-2 runs inland from Málaga to Álora.  The stations are:
 Centro-Alameda
 María Zambrano
 Victoria Kent
 Los Prados
 Campanillas
 Cártama
 Aljaima
 Pizarra
 Álora

Future expansion
The Costa del Sol railway extension of the C-1 service from its current Fuengirola terminus to Marbella and Estepona is planned. In January 2018 three possible route alignments were determined, costing between €2 billion and €3.8 billion.

See also 
 Cercanías

References

Malaga
Málaga